This I Believe is an early Australian television program. Broadcast 5 nights a week on Sydney station ATN-7, it debuted 3 December 1956 (on ATN's second day of programming). It was a 15-minute program in which Eric Baume would provide a commentary on current world events. The program ended around July 1958. According to television listings in the Sydney Morning Herald, the last few episodes of the program aired in an 11-minute time-slot.

This I Believe was also a radio program with Baume, which debuted before the television series.

An episode of this program is held by the National Film and Sound Archive and has been digitised.

See also
State Your Case – weekly (on Sundays) television program with Eric Baume from 1957
Eric Baume's Viewpoint – 1959–1961 television program with Baume

References

External links
 

1956 Australian television series debuts
1958 Australian television series endings
Australian television news shows
Black-and-white Australian television shows
English-language television shows
Seven Network original programming
Television series based on radio series